Gilbert Universalis or Gilbertus Universalis (died 1134) was a medieval Bishop of London.

Life

Gilbert was elected to the see of London about December 1127. He was consecrated on 22 January 1128. He died on 9 August 1134. His death was commemorated on 9 August.

Works

Gilbert the Universal worked on the so-called Glossa ordinaria, a compilation of what historically prominent commentators had written on the books of the Bible. Gilbert also compiled the Gloss on Lamentations. He is particularly notable for developing the previous compilation of Paschasius Radbertus on Lamentations into an argument for the Christian use of Ciceronian rhetoric.

Notes

Citations

References

Further reading

Bishops of London
1134 deaths
12th-century English Roman Catholic bishops
Year of birth unknown